With Footnotes is the debut album by the Christian group 2nd Chapter of Acts, released in 1974. It contains one of the group's most well-known songs, "Easter Song", which was named by CCM Magazine in 1998 as the No. 4 Christian song of all time.

Track listing

Source(s):

Personnel
 2nd Chapter of Acts – vocals
 Mike Been – bass
 Mike Deasy – guitar
 Jim Gordon – drums
 John Guerin – drums
 Annie Herring – piano
 Tom Keene – piano, string/horn arrangements on "I Don't Wanna Go Home" 
 David Kemper – drums
 Al McKay – guitar
 Art Munson – guitar
 Michael Omartian – ARP synthesizer, piano, organ, drums, string/horn arrangements except "I Don't Wanna Go Home" 
 Joe Osborn – bass
 Danny Timms – piano, organ
 Wally Duguid – photography
Source(s):

References

1974 debut albums
2nd Chapter of Acts albums